The Political Secretary to the Prime Minister of the United Kingdom is a senior official in the United Kingdom Civil Service who advises the Prime Minister of the United Kingdom.

List of political secretaries to the prime minister of the United Kingdom

References

See also 

 Secretary

British Prime Minister's Office
Civil service positions in the United Kingdom